The Britannia was a British 4-wheeled cyclecar made in 1913 and 1914 by Britannia Engineering Co. Ltd based in Nottingham.

The car was powered by an air-cooled, two-cylinder, two-stroke engine driving the rear wheels by a four-speed gearbox and belts. It cost GBP85.

See also
 List of car manufacturers of the United Kingdom

References 

Cyclecars
Defunct motor vehicle manufacturers of England
Companies based in Nottingham
Vehicle manufacturing companies established in 1913